Channel 23 or TV23 may refer to several television stations:

 TV23 (Cobb County), a cable-only government-access television channel in Cobb County, Georgia, USA
 Israeli Educational Television, a state-owned public television network in Israel
 Studio 23, a former television network in the Philippines
 DWAC-TV, the flagship television station of ABS-CBN Sports+Action channel 23 in Metro Manila, Philippines
 TV23, a news channel in Switzerland owned by Swiss Telegraphic Agency
 THBT (Channel 23 UHF), a channel TV of Ben Tre Television Stations in Ben Tre province, Vietnam.

Canada
The following television stations operate on virtual channel 23 in Canada:
 CIVP-DT in Chapeau, Quebec

See also
 Channel 23 virtual TV stations in the United States
For UHF frequencies covering 524-530 MHz:
 Channel 23 TV stations in Canada
 Channel 23 TV stations in Mexico
 Channel 23 digital TV stations in the United States
 Channel 23 low-power TV stations in the United States

23